John Hickson may refer to:

John Hickson (cinematographer), American cinematographer
John Hickson (cricketer) (1864–1945), English cricketer and umpire
John Lawrence Hickson (1862–1920), English rugby union footballer